That Midnight Kiss is a 1949 Technicolor American musical romance film also starring Mario Lanza (in his first leading role) and Kathryn Grayson. Among the supporting cast were Ethel Barrymore, conductor/pianist Jose Iturbi (playing himself), Keenan Wynn, J. Carrol Naish, and Jules Munshin. The commercially popular film was directed by Norman Taurog, who the following year would again direct Lanza and Grayson in the even more successful The Toast of New Orleans.

Plot 

Abigail Trent Budell (Ethel Barrymore), a wealthy resident of Philadelphia and patron of the arts, supports her soprano granddaughter Prudence Budell (Kathryn Grayson), just returning from Europe after five years of vocal training. Prudence's grandmother sponsors an opera company run by the famous maestro Jose Iturbi (himself) to give her chance to lead an opera. They hire the also famous tenor Guido Russino Betelli (Thomas Gomez), but Prudence does not feel comfortable with him on the stage.

Prudence happens to see an American-Italian truck driver, Johnny Donnetti (Mario Lanza), singing opera. She soon becomes instrumental in bringing Johnny to public attention by insisting that he replace the opera troupe's defecting star tenor.

From here, Johnny becomes attracted to Prudence. Things get complicated when she encounters Mary (Marjorie Reynolds), one of Johnny's colleagues, whom she assumes is in love with him.

Cast 
 Kathryn Grayson as Prudence Budell
 José Iturbi as José Iturbi (as Jose Iturbi)
 Ethel Barrymore as Abigail Trent Budell
 Mario Lanza as Johnny Donnetti
 Keenan Wynn as Artie Geoffrey Glenson
 J. Carrol Naish as Papa Donnetti
 Jules Munshin as Michael Pemberton
 Thomas Gomez as Guido Russino Betelli
 Marjorie Reynolds as Mary
 Arthur Treacher as Hutchins
 Mimi Aguglia as Mamma Donnetti
 Amparo Iturbi as Amparo Iturbi
 Bridget Carr as Donna Donnetti
 Amparo Ballester as Rosina Donnetti
 Ann Codee as Mme. Bouget

Reception 
According to MGM records the film earned $1,728,000 in the US and Canada and $1,449,000 overseas resulting in a profit of $173,000.

References

External links 
 
 
 
 

1949 films
1940s romantic musical films
American romantic musical films
1940s English-language films
Films directed by Norman Taurog
Films about opera
Films set in Philadelphia
Metro-Goldwyn-Mayer films
Films produced by Joe Pasternak
1940s American films